Knefastia tuberculifera is a species of sea snail, a marine gastropod mollusk in the family Pseudomelatomidae, the turrids and allies.

Description
The length of the shell varies between 40 mm and 80 mm.

Distribution
This marine species occurs in the Sea of Cortez, Western Mexico and down to Nicaragua

References

 Broderip W.J. & Sowerby I G. B. (1829). Observations on new or interesting mollusca contained, for the most part, in the Museum of the Zoological Society. Zoological Journal. 4: 359–379.

External links

 
 Gastropods.com: Knefastia tuberculifera

tuberculifera
Gastropods described in 1829